Turner Contemporary is one of the UK’s leading contemporary art galleries. Celebrating Margate’s connection with the painter J. M. W. Turner (1775 – 1851), an artist who believed that art could be an agent of change, its year-round exhibition programme offers free access to creative and cultural experiences. The building, designed by Sir David Chipperfield, is recognised as an important cultural icon. The ground floor accommodates a reception area, shop, event space and cafe while the main exhibition spaces are on the first floor, benefitting from natural north light and panoramic views of the North Sea.

Working with Kent County Council, a committed partner in a long-term strategy that puts culture at the heart of place-making, the gallery has established a locally embedded, nationally significant gallery connecting art, people, and place. Turner Contemporary plays a leading role in advocating for the importance of curiosity, critical thinking, and creative learning. Its pioneering Learning programme works with thousands of children, young people, and adults every year. The gallery is committed to ensuring that its work is relevant and representative of diverse audiences, particularly those in its immediate vicinity. Philosophical enquiry, child-led leadership and co-curation underpin Turner Contemporary's approach. Prior to the pandemic the gallery attracted c.400,000 visitors a year, making it one of Kent’s top visitor attractions.

Turner Contemporary is widely recognised as an essential catalyst for the regeneration of East Kent and has a strong track record of driving positive impact through the arts. Margate has fast become one of the most exciting creative hubs in the UK with a growing arts scene. Though this rise echoes few other seaside towns, the economy within Thanet is fragile. The gallery’s activities continue to reflect a commitment to inspire through art and look to develop social as well as economic impacts that help tackle local challenges. Positioning itself as a cultural anchor, the gallery fosters relationships and builds networks between artists, art professionals, and organisations looking to increase co-production opportunities and champion a more creative connected community.

Victoria Pomery OBE was appointed Founding Director in 2002. She left her post in September 2021 to join The Box, Plymouth, after 19 years in post and through the gallery’s first 10 years of operation. In January 2022, Clarrie Wallis took over as Director of Turner Contemporary. Wallis was previously Tate’s Senior Curator of Contemporary Art since 2016 and a curator at Tate since 1999.

Since opening in 2011, Turner Contemporary has welcomed over 3.6 million visitors and presented over 100 exhibitions involving 2,000 artists. Its exhibition and learning programme stimulate meaningful discussion about culture and society. The gallery supports artists at different stages in their careers. Exhibitions range from first solo shows by artists such as Michael Armitage and Larry Achiampong that develop artistic talent, to survey exhibitions of internationally renowned figures including Tracey Emin, Akram Zaatari and Steve McQueen.

History

Architectural Design 
In August 2013 the gallery received its millionth visitor.

Turner Contemporary is located on a prominent seafront, where a guesthouse frequented by J.M.W. Turner once stood. The two-storey building is designed to maximise both the dramatic setting between sea and land and the extraordinary light conditions unique to the area that inspired Turner. It is composed of six identical crystalline volumes with mono-pitched roofs providing north light to the gallery spaces and revealing daily and seasonal light changes. Direct daylight enters the building from the clerestory windows on the north side and diffused sunlight from the skylights above each of the six volumes.

As the seafront is occasionally flooded, the building has been raised on a plinth and its immediate surroundings provided with a hard landscape. The building is constructed with a concrete frame and acid-etched glass skin. The envelope must withstand the corrosive nature of the sea, high humidity levels, strong winds and the occasional wave overtopping the building. The façades are primarily of glass with reinforced windows. Internally, the material palette is reduced to hard-wearing screed floors and dry lining to facilitate the hanging of changing exhibitions.

On 20 February 2020, Turner Contemporary became the first contemporary building to feature on a Bank of England note. The £20 note features an image of artist J.M.W. Turner, alongside Turner Contemporary and the Margate lighthouse.

Turner Contemporary is the largest dedicated visual arts venue in Kent. It is a registered charity under English law.

Links to J.M.W. Turner 
Built on the site of the former guesthouse where the gallery’s namesake J.M.W. Turner visited, the skies that inspired much of his work are visible from Turner Contemporary’s windows. These views, which featured in many of his paintings, led him to state, to art critic John Ruskin, that “the skies over Thanet are the loveliest in all Europe”.

Turner loved Margate; more than 100 of his works were inspired by the East Kent coast. He first visited the seaside town aged 11 when his parents sent him to school there. After returning to sketch the town aged 21, he became a regular visitor. He would often travel from London to Margate on a steamboat, prior to the development of the railway. It was the unique quality of light in this part of Kent that drew Turner back. His relationship with his landlady, Mrs Booth, who owned a guesthouse where the gallery now stands, was also clearly special to him – he began calling himself ‘Mr Booth’ after the death of her husband.

Turner Contemporary has no permanent collection of its own, and only one permanent artwork - Michael Craig Martin’s Turning Pages 2011, which has been positioned in the ground-floor Sunley Gallery since Turner Contemporary opened. The neon work is a recreation of Craig-Martin’s first ever public commission for Margate Library in 1975 and was installed in the Sunley Gallery for Turner Contemporary’s opening in 2011.

Recognition 
In November 2011, the venue received an award from the British Guild of Travel Writers, for an outstanding tourism project. Queen Elizabeth II visited Turner Contemporary on 11 November 2011, as part of a wider trip to Margate.

Gallery

References

External links
 Turner Contemporary

2001 establishments in England
Art museums established in 2001
Art museums and galleries in Kent
Arts centres in England
Charities based in England
Contemporary art galleries in England
Cultural infrastructure completed in 2011
David Chipperfield buildings
J. M. W. Turner
Margate